The National Industrial Relations Court (NIRC) was established on 1 December 1971 under Section 99 of the Industrial Relations Act 1971.  The NIRC was created by the Conservative government of Ted Heath as a way to limit the power of trades union in the United Kingdom.  It was empowered to grant injunctions as necessary to prevent injurious strikes and also to settle a variety of labour disputes.  It also heard appeals from the Industrial tribunals.  Unusually, its jurisdiction extended throughout the UK, making no distinction between England and Wales or Scotland.

Its first and only President was John Donaldson, supported by John Brightman (both High Court judges who later became Law Lords) and Lord Thomson, a judge of the Scottish Court of Session.  The court also had nine appointed lay members, and one of the three judges sat with a lay panel.  The court hearings were in public, but its procedure was relatively informal, with neither the judge nor barristers wearing wigs or gowns.

The NIRC was controversial throughout its short life.  Donaldson, the president of the court, was known to have Conservative leanings, having stood as a Parliamentary candidate for the Conservative party and, indeed, having contributed to the drafting of the Industrial Relations Act.  Many cases were decided against the trades unions, although the unions had a policy of not co-operating with, and in many cases ignoring, the court.  In July 1972, a dispute involving the dock workers union led to five shop stewards being imprisoned in Pentonville Prison for contempt of court.  Unofficial strike action in support of the Pentonville Five created a national crisis, only averted when the Official Solicitor (advised by John Vinelott, later a High Court judge) appealed the arrests to the Court of Appeal, who ordered their release.  A dispute involving the Amalgamated Union of Engineering Workers also led to a finding of contempt of court, a substantial fine, and an order for the sequestration of the assets of the union (although the fine was ultimately paid anonymously).

The NIRC was abolished by the Trade Union and Labour Relations Act 1974 soon after the Labour government of Harold Wilson came to power in 1974.

One of the leading legal decisions of the NIRC was Norton Tool Co Ltd v Tewson [1972] ICR, in which Donaldson J ruled that damages for wrongful dismissal only extended to financial loss, and that compensation was not available for non-pecuniary losses, such as injury to pride or feelings.  This position was doubted by Lord Hoffmann in Johnson v Unisys Ltd [2003] 1 AC 518, but upheld in Dunnachie v Kingston-upon-Hull City Council [2004] UKHL 36.

External links
Catalogue of the Papers of the Trades Union Congress
Single or Return - the official history of the Transport Salaried Staffs' Association, Chapter Twenty-Seven
In the Cause of Labour - Chapter 21 - The Road to Pentonville

Labour relations in the United Kingdom
Former courts and tribunals in the United Kingdom
1971 establishments in the United Kingdom
Courts and tribunals established in 1971
Courts and tribunals disestablished in 1974